Sébastien Cibois (born 2 March 1998) is a French professional footballer who plays as a goalkeeper for  club Rodez.

Career

Paris Saint-Germain 
Cibois signed his first professional contract with Paris Saint-Germain (PSG) on 28 May 2018, a deal until 30 June 2021. He continued making appearances for the reserve team of PSG during the 2018–19 season. However, on 3 September 2019, Cibois decided to terminate his contract with the Parisian club. This was largely due to the fact that he went further down in the goalkeeper hierarchy with the arrival of Marcin Bułka from Chelsea.

Brest 
On 7 January 2020, Cibois signed a two-and-a-half year contract with Brest. He made his professional debut in a 2–1 Ligue 1 win over Bordeaux on 7 February 2021, over one year later. On 10 February, Cibois made his Coupe de France debut in a 2–1 victory against Rodez. He kept his first clean sheet in a 0–0 draw against Lille four days later.

Rodez 
On 4 June 2022, Cibois joined Rodez on a three-year contract.

Career statistics

Honours 
Paris Saint-Germain U19
 Championnat National U19: 2015–16
 UEFA Youth League runner-up: 2015–16

References

External links 
 
 

1998 births
Living people
French footballers
Footballers from Val-d'Oise
Association football goalkeepers
Sportspeople from Argenteuil
Paris Saint-Germain F.C. players
Stade Brestois 29 players
Rodez AF players
Championnat National 2 players
Championnat National 3 players
Ligue 1 players
Ligue 2 players